Dr. Juan A. Rivero Zoo, officially named the Dr. Juan A. Rivero Zoo of Puerto Rico, also known as the Mayagüez Zoo, was a  zoo located in Mayagüez, Puerto Rico, owned by the Government of Puerto Rico and operated by the Department of Natural and Environmental Resources. It was named in honor of Juan A. Rivero, its first director. It was Puerto Rico's only zoo and had an extensive collection of animals from all continents. The zoo closed after the impact of Hurricane Maria in 2017 and fully ceased operations in 2023 after much scrutiny in its final years due to questionable health and treatment of their animals, many of which are being relocated to sanctuaries across the United States.

History
The zoo was originally opened in 1954, when legislator Benjamin Cole authored the law that created the zoo. The zoo was given the name of its founder and first director Dr. Juan A. Rivero. Starting in 2003 the zoo went through a major upgrade with the addition of the aviary, arthropodary and a butterfly exhibition.

In March 2008 the zoo acquired two new giraffes and two desert warthogs to augment the African collection.  The animals were brought from Ohio and Louisiana. The economic crisis related to the government debt crisis in Puerto Rico, which began in 2014, led to issues with zoo maintenance and animal care.

Within the last ten years alone, the zoo had been cited for several violations of inhumane killings, including a puma, coatimundi, and a baboon that were "not fit for exhibition". Two guinea pigs on exhibition were fed alive to reptiles, and deer on exhibition were fed to big cats after having their jugulars cut without using a humane slaughter method. There were also accounts of the zoo using expired medications and having inadequate vet care. The United States Department of Agriculture investigated the zoo, and has not renewed the zoo's federal permits.

Despite the zoo being closed to the public after the passing of Hurricane Maria in September 2017, the zoo still has animals with workers caring for them, and two heathy lion cubs were born at the zoo in 2019. FEMA has assigned $6.2 million for repairs related to the Hurricane.

Since at least 2019 volunteers have helped maintain the Zoo and began preparations for the planned reopening of the facilities, including by painting a mural in the entrance area. The Department of Natural Resources has announced a planned reopening date for 2021.
 On May 23, 2022, it was announced that the zoo's chimpanzee, Magnum, had passed away at the age of 39. Although the official cause of death given was his advanced age, animal rights activists asked for his death to be investigated, as they claim he had cardiac ailments for which he received no treatment.

On February 27, 2023, it was announced that the zoo will be closing down permanently, with many of the animals being moved to sanctuaries.

Conservation programs
Committed to animal welfare, especially those facing extinction, the zoo has several conservations programs for the following species:

 Puerto Rican crested toad
 Paloma sabanera (plain pigeon)
 Andean condor

Facilities

After the passing of Hurricane Maria the zoo with the following facilities remained closed to the general public:

 Recreational areas
 Souvenir Shop
 Museum
 Aviary
 Mammal, birds, reptile and amphibian exhibits
 Arthropodary

Adoption program
In an effort to promote conservation, the Dr. Rivero Zoo has started an adoption program in which citizens can "adopt" one of the zoo's animals, and donate to contribute in conservation efforts.

References

External links

 Zoo Webpage at National Parks Company Website

Zoos in Puerto Rico
Buildings and structures in Mayagüez, Puerto Rico
Tourist attractions in Mayagüez, Puerto Rico
Zoos established in 1954
1954 establishments in Puerto Rico